Sahya Arts and Science College is a self-financing tertiary education institution established in 2013 under the aegis of Sahya Tourism and Pravasi Co-operative Society (STPC) Ltd with the sole intention to mold the younger generation of rural areas of Malappuram district into qualified and responsible citizens with deep values who can contribute to the progress of India. It is located in Palamadam, Just  from Wandoor in the Malappuram district of Kerala. College is affiliated to the University of Calicut and have ten valuable UG arts and science courses and one PG course under University of Calicut.

Courses
The college offers ten undergraduate courses and one postgraduate course

Under Graduate Courses
 BSc Psychology
 BSc Chemistry
 BA English
 BA Economics
 BBA
 BCom Cooperation

Postgraduate course
 MCom

Nodal Centre
Sahya Arts and Science College is a Nodal Centre of University of Calicut and Mrs. Rubeena . is appointed as the Nodal Officer.

See also

References

External links 

Facebook Page
University of Calicut
University Grants Commission
National Assessment and Accreditation Council

Arts and Science colleges in Kerala
Universities and colleges in Malappuram district
Educational institutions established in 2013
2013 establishments in Kerala